The Côte Fleurie (or Flowery Coast) stretches for approximately  between Merville-Franceville-Plage, at the mouth of the Orne river, opposite Ouistreham to the west and Honfleur on the Seine estuary in the east. It forms part of the eastern Basse-Normandie (Lower Normandy) coast on the English Channel to the north of the Pays d'Auge in the Calvados department. The coast between the towns of Trouville and Honfleur, although part of the Côte Fleurie, is named Côte de Grace. Dives-sur-Mer is on the Côte Fleurie but possesses no beach or seafront. The Côte de Nacre continues west from the Touques estuary.

The name was given in 1903 by Raymond Coustant de Yanville, president of the regional horticultural society, to the flowered countryside lying beyond the coastal hills and to the gardens of the 19th-century seafront villas built during the Belle Époque. With the development of tourism in the late 19th and early 20th centuries, the French coastline was split into various names to distinguish their varying landscapes (see map). The coastline had a number of long sandy beaches separated by low cliffs and two river valleys; the Vallées de la Dives and the Vallée de la Touques.

From east to west, the coast's main towns and villages are:

 Honfleur
 Villerville
 Trouville-sur-Mer
 Deauville
 Bénerville-sur-Mer
 Tourgéville
 Blonville-sur-Mer
 Villers-sur-Mer
 Houlgate
 Dives-sur-Mer
 Cabourg
 La Home-Varaville
 Merville-Franceville-Plage
 Sallenelles

Second World War
The area was liberated by the Brigade Piron in September 1944.

Gallery

References

Articles
 "Normandy’s Quiet Glamour", New York Times, Aug. 8, 2010

Landforms of Calvados (department)
Fleurie
Landforms of Normandy
Belle Époque